The Baptist Union of Burundi is a Baptist Christian denomination in Burundi. It is affiliated with the Baptist World Alliance. The headquarters is in Bujumbura.

History
The Union has its origins in a Baptist mission of Baptist Union of Denmark in 1928. In 1962, it was founded under the name of Union of Baptist Churches in Burundi. According to a denomination census released in 2020, it claimed 230 churches and 52,000 members.

References

External links
 Official Website

Baptist denominations in Africa
Evangelicalism in Burundi